APOBEC1 complementation factor is a protein that in humans is encoded by the A1CF gene.

Gene 

Alternative splicing occurs at this locus and three full-length transcript variants, encoding three distinct isoforms, have been described. Additional splicing has been observed but the full-length nature of these variants has not been determined.

Function 

Mammalian apolipoprotein B mRNA undergoes site-specific C to U deamination, which is mediated by a multi-component enzyme complex containing a minimal core composed of APOBEC1 and a complementation factor encoded by this gene. The gene product has three non-identical RNA recognition motifs and belongs to the hnRNP R family of RNA-binding proteins. It has been proposed that this complementation factor functions as an RNA-binding subunit and docks APOBEC1 to deaminate the upstream cytidine. Studies suggest that the protein may also be involved in other RNA editing or RNA processing events.

Its deletion results in lethality in mice.

Interactions 

A1CF has been shown to interact with APOBEC1, CUGBP2, and SYNCRIP.

References

External links

Further reading 

 
 
 
 
 
 
 
 
 
 
 
 
 
 

Human proteins